James E. Boyd may refer to:
 James E. Boyd (politician) (1834–1906), Governor of Nebraska
 James E. Boyd (scientist) (1906–1998), American physicist, mathematician, and professor
 James Edmund Boyd (1845–1935), United States federal judge

See also
James Boyd (disambiguation)